Carramboa is a genus of flowering plants in the daisy family.

 Species
The genus is native to South America

References

Millerieae
Asteraceae genera
Flora of South America